Grade I historic buildings in Hong Kong are those selected as those "outstanding merits of which every effort should be made to preserve if possible".

These buildings may be protected under the Antiquities and Monuments Ordinance; after consulting the Antiquities Advisory Board, with the approval of the Chief Executive and the publication of the notice in government gazette, the Antiquities Authority may legally declare the Graded historic buildings to be protected as Declared Monuments. Five Grade I historic buildings have been demolished in the last two decades.

Note: This list is accurate  A territory-wide grade reassessment has been ongoing since. See this link for the latest grading update.

Central and Western District

|}

Eastern District

|}

Islands District

|}

Kowloon City District

|}

Kwun Tong District

|}

North District

|}

Sai Kung District

|}

Sha Tin District

|}

Sham Shui Po District

|}

Southern District

|}

Tai Po District

|}

Tsuen Wan District

|}

Tuen Mun District

|}

Wan Chai District

|}

Wong Tai Sin District

|}

Yau Tsim Mong District

|}

Yuen Long District

|}

See also

 List of buildings and structures in Hong Kong
 Heritage conservation in Hong Kong
 Declared monuments of Hong Kong
 List of Grade II historic buildings in Hong Kong
 List of Grade III historic buildings in Hong Kong
 Heritage Trails in Hong Kong
 History of Hong Kong

References

 
Declared monuments
Historic Hong Kong Grade 1